Laurence Dwight Smith (1895-1952) was an American author specializing in crime fiction and cryptography.

Early life and education

Smith was born in Detroit, Michigan on January 24, 1895.  After completing preparatory school at the Phillips Academy in 1914, he attended Yale College and, after graduating, took a job with the Winchester Repeating Arms Company in New Haven, Connecticut as a machinist.  He married Kathryn Marsh of New York City in August 1917, and in January 1918 he enlisted in the U.S. Army.  Having been promoted to sergent in the Corps of Intelligence Police during World War I, he was discharged after the war in September 1919 at the age of 24.

Works

Fiction
 Death is thy neighbour, 1938
 Girl Hunt Red Arrow Books, 1939
 The G-Men Smash the Professor's Gang, Illustrated by Robb Beebe, 1936, Grosset & Dunlap
 The G Men in Jeopardy. Illustrated by Milton Marx. 1938. Grosset & Dunlap.
 The G-Men trap the Spy Ring Illustrated by Paul Laune. 1939. Grosset & Dunlap
 Mystery of the Yellow Tie, 1939
 Hiram and other Cats, Grosset & Dunlap, 1941
 Adirondack Adventure, 1945
 Reunion, Samuel Curl Inc,  1946

Non-fiction
 Cryptography - the science of secret writing, W. W. Norton & Company, New York, 1943 (US); George Allen and Unwin, London, 1944 (UK)
 Hooked - Narcotics: America's Peril, with Rafael de Soto, 1953
 Cryptography W.W Norton and Co, 1971
 Counterfeiting - crime against the people, 1944

References

American crime fiction writers
Cryptography books
American crime novels
American male novelists